Lesotho competed at the 1980 Summer Olympics in Moscow, USSR.

Athletics

Men

References
Official Olympic Reports

Nations at the 1980 Summer Olympics
1980
1980 in Lesotho sport